The 2005–06 season of the Eredivisie began in August 2005 and ended in May 2006. PSV Eindhoven became champion on April 9, 2006. The season was overshadowed by the death of FC Utrecht player David di Tommaso.

Promoted teams
These teams were promoted from the Eerste Divisie at the start of the season:
 Heracles Almelo (First Division champion)
 Sparta Rotterdam (playoffs)

Relegated teams
These team was relegated to the Eerste Divisie at the end of the season:
 RBC Roosendaal

League table

Results

Topscorers

Awards

Dutch Footballer of the Year
 2005 / 2006 — Dirk Kuyt (Feyenoord Rotterdam)

Dutch Golden Shoe Winner
 2005 — Mark van Bommel (PSV Eindhoven)

The 2005-06 Eredivisie play-offs
Prior to finishing on 4th place in the regular season, Ajax had already reached the KNVB Cup final. In this final, they faced and defeated Eredivisie champions PSV. Ajax would have qualified for the UEFA Cup via the cup even if they had lost the final. This had consequences for the play-off schedule. Games F and H were not played. The teams ranked 2 to 5 instead played for one Champions League qualifier ticket and three UEFA Cup tickets. The fourth and final UEFA Cup ticket went to the winner of matches C, D and G, between the teams who finished from 6th to 9th place in the regular season. The loser of match G played the winner of a play-off between positions 10 to 13 of the regular league for a place in the UEFA Intertoto Cup. All rounds were played in two legs, one home match and one away match, with away goals as the first tiebreaker.

For UEFA competitions
For one Champions League ticket and three UEFA Cup tickets

For one UEFA Cup ticket and possibly one Intertoto Cup ticket

For possibly one Intertoto Cup ticket

For the Intertoto Cup ticket

Overview

For promotion and relegation
For two Eredivisie tickets 
Round 1

Round 2 (best of 3)

|}

Round 3 (best of 3)

|}

NAC Breda and Willem II remained in the Eredivisie.

See also
 2005–06 Eerste Divisie
 2005–06 KNVB Cup
 2005–06 Sparta Rotterdam season

References

 Eredivisie official website - info on all seasons 
 RSSSF

Eredivisie seasons
Netherlands
1